The Gloryland Way is a studio album by American country music singer–songwriter Hank Locklin. It was released in August 1966 via RCA Victor Records and was produced by Chet Atkins. It was Locklin's first studio release to contain entirely religious music, specifically gospel music. The project was also Locklin's fourteenth studio album. After its release, the album received positive reception from critics.

Background, release and reception
Hank Locklin was known in his music career for recording concept albums. Previously, he had released concept albums that centered around Irish music and tribute albums to Eddy Arnold and Roy Acuff. The Gloryland Way was Locklin's first concept record to center around gospel music. It was recorded mostly in April 1966 at the RCA Victor Studio, located in Nashville, Tennessee. The sessions were produced by Chet Atkins, Locklin's longtime record producer at RCA Victor Records. The Gloryland Way consisted of 12 tracks. Three of the album's tracks were composed by Locklin himself: "That Inner Glow," "The Upper Room" and "Fifty Miles of Elbow Room." The remainder of the album's tracks were composed by other songwriters and performers. This included a cover of "Kneel at the Cross," which was written by Charles E. Moody. The final track, "Wings of a Dove," was first a hit for Ferlin Husky.

The Gloryland Way was released in August 1966 via RCA Victor Records. It was Locklin's fourteenth studio album released in his career. It was distributed as a vinyl LP, with six tracks on either side of the record. It was later issued digitally for music downloads and streaming services, including Apple Music. The project did not spawn any known singles upon its release. While "The Upper Room" had been released as a single several years prior, it was re-recorded for this album. The album received a positive response from Billboard magazine upon its release in 1966. Writers of the publication called The Gloryland Way, "a package of gospel sides with a world of life and spirit." The writers also praised the album's unique gospel approach, in comparison to his previous studio releases.

Track listing

Vinyl version

Digital version

Personnel
All credits are adapted from the liner notes of The Gloryland Way.

Musical and technical personnel
 Chet Atkins – producer
 Hank Locklin – lead vocals
 The Imperials Quartet – background vocals
 William Vandevort – recording engineer

Release history

References

1966 albums
Albums produced by Chet Atkins
Hank Locklin albums
RCA Victor albums